Bryan Todd may refer to:

 Bryan Todd (businessman) (1902–1987), New Zealand businessman in the oil, gas, and related industries
 Bryan Todd (record producer) (born 1973), American record producer and songwriter
 Bryan Todd (rugby league) (1938–2018), English rugby league footballer